The 2003 Chilean telethon (Spanish: Teletón 2003) was the 18th version of the charity campaign held in Chile since 1978, which took place on November 21–22, 2003. As in the previous year the theme of this version was "The Telethon is Yours" (La Teletón es tuya). The amount of money taken during the day suggested the goal would not be achieved, in the end it required a cash assistance by the Government of Chile to meet the goal. The poster boy chosen for the event was Camilo Valverde.

The 2003 edition marked the Teleton's silver jubilee year and much attention was given to the work that it had garnered for a quarter century.

Computing

Sponsors

Artists

National singers 
  Luis Jara
  María José Quintanilla
  Douglas
  Myriam Hernández
  Andrés De León
  Pablo Herrera
  La Sonora de Tommy Rey
  Chancho en Piedra
  Quique Neira
  Cesar Ávila
  Andrea Labarca
  Ximena Abarca
  Canal Magdalena

Foreigner singers 
  Emmanuel
  Chayanne
  Pedro Fernández
  Soraya
  Amaral
  Bandana
  Mambrú
  Antonio Ríos
  Azul Azul
  Yuri
  Los Nocheros
  Cristian Castro

Comedians 
 Álvaro Salas
 Salomón y Tutu Tutu
 Paulo Iglesias
 La Cuatro Dientes
 Stefan Kramer
 Ricardo Meruane
 Los Indolatinos
 Arturo Ruiz-Tagle
 Bombo Fica

Magazine
 Politicians danced with the Clan Rojo
 Team Mekano

Children's section 
 Cachureos
 Los Tachuelas
 Zoolo TV
 31 Minutos
 Jessica Abudinen

Adult's section 
 Moulin Rouge Musical
 Pia Guzmán
 María José Campos
 Francesca Cigna
 Adela Calderón
 Henry Churchill
 Iliana Calabró
 Marlén Olivarí

Transmission 
 Red Televisión
 UCV Televisión
 Televisión Nacional de Chile
 Mega
 Chilevisión
 Canal 13
 Canal Regional

References

External links 

Telethon
Chilean telethons